Mario Esteban Pardo Acuña (born 13 May 1988) is a Chilean footballer that currently plays for Primera B de Chile club C.D. Cobresal as centre back.

External links
 
 
 Mario Pardo at Football-Lineups

1988 births
Living people
Chilean footballers
Deportes La Serena footballers
Unión La Calera footballers
A.C. Barnechea footballers
Deportes Temuco footballers
San Antonio Unido footballers
Deportes Iberia footballers
Coquimbo Unido footballers
Deportes Melipilla footballers
Cobresal footballers
Chilean Primera División players
Primera B de Chile players
Association football defenders
People from La Serena